John Aloysius Duffy (October 29, 1884 – September 27, 1944) was an American prelate of the Roman Catholic Church. He served as bishop of the Diocese of Syracuse  in New York from 1933 to 1937, and as bishop of the Diocese of Buffalo in New York from 1937 until his death in 1944.

Biography

Early life 
John Duffy was born on October 29, 1884, in Jersey City, New Jersey, to Patrick Joseph and Anna Marie (née Smith) Duffy. As a young man, he worked as a boilermaker in Elizabeth, New Jersey and Bayonne.
 

Duffy was ordained to the priesthood for the Diocese of Newark on June 13, 1908. Duffy then served as assistant pastor at the Church of Our Lady of Grace (Hoboken, New Jersey), professor of literature and languages at Seton Hall University, and instructor in Church history at the Newark seminary.Duffy was named a domestic prelate, and served as chancellor and vicar general for the diocese. As vicar general, Monsignor Duffy was instrumental in the establishment of Queen of Angels, the first parish for people of color in the Newark diocese. He was the diocese's apostolic administrator between the death of John O'Connor and the appointment of Thomas Walsh, and served as pastor of St. Joseph's Parish in Jersey City.

Bishop of Syracuse 
On April 21, 1933, Duffy was appointed the fourth Bishop of Syracuse by Pope Pius XI. He received his episcopal consecration on June 29, 1933, from Archbishop Walsh, with Bishops James Griffin and Alphonse Smith serving as co-consecrators. He selected as his episcopal motto: "Wisdom from Above." In 1934, when fan dancer Sally Rand was scheduled to appear in Syracuse, the Bishop said, "I must regard the presence of the Rand woman on the stage as an act of public defiance of the Catholic people of Syracuse."

Bishop of Buffalo 
Pius XI named Duffy as the seventh Bishop of Buffalo on January 9, 1937. He was installed on April 14, 1937. In 1939 and 1940 he served as secretary of the National Catholic Welfare Council.

During his tenure, he established the Diocesan Fund for the Faith for those left in need because of the Great Depression, erected parishes in the sparsely settled areas of the diocese, and organized the Catholic Youth Organization, Bishop's Committee for Christian Home and Family, Confraternity of Christian Doctrine, and Newman Clubs.

John Duffy died on September 27, 1944, at age 59, and was buried next to his parents in Holy Name Cemetery in Jersey City.

References

1884 births
1944 deaths
Clergy from Jersey City, New Jersey
Seton Hall University faculty
Roman Catholic bishops of Syracuse
Roman Catholic bishops of Buffalo
20th-century Roman Catholic bishops in the United States
Catholics from New Jersey
American boilermakers